A by-election for the Kyoto-3rd seat in the Japanese House of Representatives was held on 24 April 2016, coinciding with the by-election in Hokkaido. The seat became vacant after sitting member Kensuke Miyazaki resigned on 12 February 2016 in the midst of an extramarital affair scandal. Miyazaki, a member of the Liberal Democratic Party, served the district from 2012. He defeated Democratic Party MP Kenta Izumi by slim margins in the 2012 (0.1%) and 2014 (2.7%) elections.

Izumi managed to wrest back his old seat by a landslide, eclipsing his nearest rival by 45 percentage points.

Outline
The district had 344,696 registered voters for the election, an increase of 0.12% since the 2014 general election. As the voting age for national elections was decreased to 18 years in June 2016, this by-election, along with the Hokkaido by-election, were the last national-level election with a minimum voting age of 20 years. The by-elections were the first national-level elections contested by the Democratic Party, Initiatives from Osaka party and Party for Japanese Kokoro under their respective current names. The Communist Party also chose not to field a candidate in the election, despite receiving 27,000 votes (16%) in the 2014 election.

Dates 
 16 March 2016 - Date of election announced
 12 April 2016 - List of candidates published
 13–23 April - Early-voting polling booths open
 24 April 2016 - Polling day

Candidates 
The by-election was a six-way race. The LDP decided against fielding a candidate due to the perceived anti-LDP sentiment in light of the Miyazaki scandal. Party bosses were also worried that a heavy defeat in Kyoto might affect LDP's campaign for the House of Councillors election in summer.

Results 

	
	

Note: 
1 The percentage swing for the Democratic Party candidate is calculated based on the vote share obtained by its predecessor, DPJ.
2 The percentage swing for the Initiatives from Osaka candidate is calculated based on the vote share obtained by its predecessor, Japan Innovation Party.

References 

2016 elections in Japan
2016
April 2016 events in Japan

ja:2016年日本の補欠選挙#衆議院京都府第3区